The Clown is a 1976 West German film directed by Vojtěch Jasný. It is based on the 1963 novel of the same name by Nobel Prize winner Heinrich Böll. It was chosen as West Germany's official submission to the 49th Academy Awards for Best Foreign Language Film, but did not manage to receive a nomination.

Plot summary

Cast

References

External links
 
 
 
 The Clown at filmportal.de/en

1976 films
1976 drama films
German drama films
West German films
1970s German-language films
Films about clowns
Films based on works by Heinrich Böll
Films based on German novels
Films directed by Vojtěch Jasný
Films set in the 1950s
Films set in the 1960s
Constantin Film films
1970s German films